Wisacky is an unincorporated community and census-designated place (CDP) in Lee County, South Carolina, United States. It was first listed as a CDP prior to the 2020 census with a population of 185.

The CDP is in eastern Lee County, centered on the junction of South Carolina Highways 341 and 527. Highway 341 leads northwest  to Bishopville, the county seat, and southeast  to Lynchburg, while Highway 527 leads south-southeast  to Kingstree.

Demographics

2020 census

Note: the US Census treats Hispanic/Latino as an ethnic category. This table excludes Latinos from the racial categories and assigns them to a separate category. Hispanics/Latinos can be of any race.

References 

Census-designated places in Lee County, South Carolina
Census-designated places in South Carolina